Plamen Yordanov Galabov (born 2 November 1995) is a Bulgarian footballer who currently plays for Maccabi Netanya as a defender.

Club career
Galabov made his competitive debut on 12 December 2012 in a Bulgarian Cup game against Spartak Varna, coming on as a substitute in the 56th minute. Litex won the game by a score of 7–1. A year later, on 14 December 2013, he made his A PFG debut in a 5–2 away win over Lokomotiv Plovdiv, playing the full 90 minutes, though he was sent off for a second yellow card in the closing moments of the match.

On 6 September 2017, Galabov was loaned to Etar Veliko Tarnovo until the end of the year. A year later he was again loaned out to Etar until the end of 2018.

International career
Galabov was named in Bulgaria's 2016 Kirin Cup squad but was later withdrawn through injury. He earned his first cap on 3 September 2020, replacing then CSKA Sofia teammate Petar Zanev for the last 11 minutes of the 1:1 home draw with Republic of Ireland in a UEFA Nations League match.

Club statistics

Club

International

Honours
CSKA Sofia
 Bulgarian Cup: 2020–21
Maccabi Netanya
 Toto Cup: 2022-23

International career
On 17 May 2016 Galabov received his first call up for Bulgaria for the Kirin Cup, but got an injury before the cup.

References

External links

1995 births
Living people
Bulgarian footballers
Bulgaria youth international footballers
PFC Litex Lovech players
PFC CSKA Sofia players
SFC Etar Veliko Tarnovo players
Maccabi Netanya F.C. players
Israeli Premier League players
First Professional Football League (Bulgaria) players
Expatriate footballers in Israel
Bulgarian expatriate sportspeople in Israel
Association football central defenders
Association football defenders
People from Shumen
Bulgaria under-21 international footballers
Bulgaria international footballers